, member of The Association of Japanese Animations, is a company centralized in the production of animated series and feature films, as well as the making and adjusting of visual effects.

History
In 1973, Tatsuo Shimamura established . To expand business, the studio was disbanded and found the company known today.

The company owns computer graphics and VFX technology, so they produced many original live-action films like Juvenile and Returner. They made the first anime production Moyasimon: Tales of Agriculture in 2007.

Apart from the headquarters in Aoyama, Minato, Tokyo, the company has a sub-studio based in Chōfu, Tokyo. Like the mainstream, they also have various sub-studios in Tokyo.

Works

Television series

Films

Original net animations

References

External links

  
 

 
Animation studios in Tokyo
Japanese animation studios
Japanese companies established in 1974
Mass media companies established in 1974
Visual effects companies